Zovuni, is a major village in the Kotayk Province of Armenia, located just north of the capital Yerevan. As of the 2019 census, the population of the village is 6251.։

See also 
Kotayk Province

References

Populated places in Kotayk Province
Yazidi populated places in Armenia